Pterostichus vernalis is a species of ground beetle native to Europe.

Their lengths usually span from 6 to 8 mm and its a black beetle with legs and antennae, dark brown to black. With a rounded pronotum, it also features toothed hind angles.

Geographically, this beetle mainly pertains to Britain, specifically in Leicestershire and Rutland.

References

Pterostichus
Beetles described in 1796
Beetles of Europe